Colaba Assembly constituency is one of the 288 Vidhan Sabha (legislative assembly) constituencies of Maharashtra state within Mumbai City in western India. Rahul Narwekar of the BJP is currently the MLA of Colaba Constituency

Overview
Colaba (constituency number 187) is one of the ten Vidhan Sabha constituencies located in the Mumbai City district.

Colaba is part of the Mumbai South Lok Sabha constituency along with five other Vidhan Sabha segments in Mumbai City district, namely Worli, Shivadi, Byculla, Malabar Hill and Mumbadevi.

Members of Legislative Assembly

Election results

2019 results

2014 results

2009 results

See also
 Colaba
 List of constituencies of Maharashtra Vidhan Sabha

References

Assembly constituencies of Mumbai
Mumbai City district
Assembly constituencies of Maharashtra